Bombay Castle (also Casa da Orta) is one of the oldest defensive structures built in the city of Mumbai (formerly Bombay). The current castle is a structure built by the British on the site of the Manor House built by a Portuguese nobleman Garcia de Orta. Orta had leased the island of Bombay from the King of Portugal between 1554 and 1570.

The castle was built of local blue Kurla stone and red laterite stone from the Konkan region to the south. The islands came under the hands of the English in 1665, and the East India Company took possession of the castle in 1668. Over the next ten years, they built a defensive structure around the manor. Between 1716 and 1723, a wall was built around the developing town. Although the wall was demolished in 1865 after the city grew rapidly, fragments still exist in some areas.

Few records of the original Portuguese castle remain and historians are trying to piece together the original location of the manor. Two gates of the manor are located within INS Angre, a naval station in South Mumbai. A sundial thought to date back to the Portuguese era is also present. This sundial does not mark out the 12 hours of a day, but rather marks out certain periods that the people of the time deemed important.

The main building within the castle was the Governor's House, in which Gerald Aungier, the second Governor of Bombay used to stay. The residence was later moved to Parel and then to Malabar Hill over the next two centuries. The current building houses the offices of the Flag Officer Commanding-in-Chief Western Naval Command.

References

External links

 History of Mumbai
 History & Geography of Mumbai
 Main Portuguese Gate to Bombay Castle at wikimapia.

Castles in India
British forts
Portuguese structures in Mumbai
Portuguese forts in India
Properties of the East India Company
British colonial architecture in India
1550s establishments in Portuguese India
1660s in British India
1670s in British India
17th-century forts in India